Magdy Ahmad Abou El-Magd (born 15 October 1972) is an Egyptian handball player. He competed in the 2000 Summer Olympics.

References

1972 births
Living people
Handball players at the 2000 Summer Olympics
Egyptian male handball players
Egyptian handball coaches 
Olympic handball players of Egypt